Exobasidium vaccinii-uliginosi is a species of fungus in the family Exobasidiaceae. It is a plant pathogen.

References

External links

Fungal plant pathogens and diseases
Ustilaginomycotina
Fungi described in 1894